Star Lift (foaled Apr 14,1984) is a British Thoroughbred racehorse, winner of the 1988 Prix Royal-Oak.

Career
Star Lift debuted on June 6th, 1987, coming in at 4th place in  Évry. On July 23, 1987, he won his first race at Saint-Cloud. In October 1988, he won at both Prix Scaramouche and Prix Royal-Oak. On April 30th, 1989, he then won at Prix d'Harcourt. On September 17th, 1989, he got his final win at Prix Foy, and finished up his career with a 9th place finish at Hollywood Turf Cup Stakes.

Pedigree

References

1984 racehorse births